Liverpool Football Club are an English professional association football club based in Liverpool, Merseyside, who currently play in the Premier League. They have played at their current home ground, Anfield, since their foundation in 1892. Liverpool joined the Football League in 1894, and were founding members of the Premier League in 1992.

This list encompasses the major honours won by Liverpool, records set by the club, their managers and their players.  The player records section includes details of the club's leading goalscorers and those who have made most appearances in first-team competitions. It also records notable achievements by Liverpool players on the international stage, and the highest transfer fees paid and received by the club. Attendance records at Anfield are also included in the list.

The club have won 19 top-flight titles, and also hold the record for the most European Cup victories by an English team, winning the competition six times. The club's record appearance maker is Ian Callaghan, who made 857 appearances between 1958 and 1978. Ian Rush is the club's record goalscorer, scoring 346 goals in total.

All statistics are correct as of 21 February 2023.

Honours

Liverpool have won honours both domestically and in European cup competitions. They have won the English top league 19 times and the League Cup a record nine times. In their first season, 1892–93, they won the Lancashire League title and the Liverpool District Cup, and their most recent success came in 2022, when they won their eighth FA Cup title.

Player records

Appearances
Most appearances in all competitions: Ian Callaghan, 857.
Most league appearances: Ian Callaghan, 640.
Most FA Cup appearances: Ian Callaghan, 79.
Most League Cup appearances: Ian Rush, 78.
Most continental appearances: Jamie Carragher, 150.
Youngest first-team player: Jerome Sinclair, 16 years and 6 days (against West Bromwich Albion, 26 September 2012).
Youngest player to start a first-team match: Harvey Elliott, 16 years and 174 days (against Milton Keynes Dons, 25 September 2019). 
Oldest first-team player: Ned Doig, 41 years and 165 days (against Newcastle United, 11 April 1908).
Oldest debutant: Ned Doig, 37 years and 307 days (against Burton United, 1 September 1904).
Most consecutive appearances: Phil Neal, 417 (from 23 October 1976 to 24 September 1983).
Most seasons playing every minute of every league and cup game: Phil Neal, 9 (from 1976–77 to 1983–84).
Longest-serving player: Elisha Scott, 21 years and 52 days (from 1913 to 1934).
Most red cards while playing for Liverpool: Steven Gerrard, 7.

Most appearances
Competitive, professional matches only, appearances as substitute in brackets.

Goalscorers

Most goals in all competitions: Ian Rush, 346.
Most league goals: Roger Hunt, 244.
Most Premier League goals:  Mohamed Salah, 129 goals
Most FA Cup goals: Ian Rush, 39.
Most League Cup goals: Ian Rush, 48.
Most Continental goals: Mohamed Salah, 42.
First player to score for Liverpool: Malcolm McVean (against Rotherham Town, 1 September 1892).
Most goals in a season: Ian Rush, 47 (during the 1983–84 season).
Most goals in a debut season: Mohamed Salah, 44 (during the 2017–18 season).
Most league goals in a season: Roger Hunt, 41 (during the 1961–62 season).
Most goals in a season by a Liverpool player in the Premier League era: Mohamed Salah, 44 (during the 2017–18 season).
Most top-flight league goals in a season: Gordon Hodgson, 36 (during the 1930–31 season)
Most continental goals in a season: Mohamed Salah and Roberto Firmino, 11 (during the 2017–18 season).
Most hat-tricks in a season: Roger Hunt, 5 (during the 1961–62 season).
Most games scored in during a single campaign: Mohamed Salah, 34 (during the 2017–18 season).
Most different goalscorers in a season: 22 (during the 2015–16 season).
Most hat-tricks: Gordon Hodgson, 17.
Most consecutive games where a player has scored: Mohamed Salah, 10 (28 August 2021 to 24 October 2021).
Fastest goal scored in a match: Paul Walsh, 14 seconds, (against West Ham United, 27 August, 1984).
Fastest hat-trick: Robbie Fowler, 4 minutes, 33 seconds, (against Arsenal, 28 August 1994).
Highest-scoring substitute: David Fairclough, 18.
Most penalties scored: Steven Gerrard, 47.
Most games without scoring for an outfield player: Ephraim Longworth, 371.
Youngest goalscorer: Ben Woodburn, 17 years, 45 days (against Leeds United, 29 November 2016).
Oldest goalscorer: Billy Liddell, 38 years, 55 days (against Stoke City, 5 March 1960).

Top goalscorers
Competitive, professional matches only. Matches played (including as a substitute) appear in brackets.

International
First capped player: Frank Becton, for England on 29 March 1897.
Most international caps while a Liverpool player: Steven Gerrard, 114 for England.
Most international goals while a Liverpool player:
Michael Owen, 26 for England.
Ian Rush, 26 for Wales.

World Cup
First Liverpool player to appear at a World Cup: Laurie Hughes for England, at 1950 FIFA World Cup.
Most World Cup appearances while a Liverpool player: Steven Gerrard, 12 for England in 2006, 2010 and 2014.
Most World Cup goals while a Liverpool player: Michael Owen, 4 for England in 1998 and 2002.
First World Cup winners: Roger Hunt, Ian Callaghan and Gerry Byrne, in 1966 with England.
First non-British player to appear in a World Cup final: Dietmar Hamann, Germany, in 2002.
First non-British World Cup winners: Fernando Torres and Pepe Reina, Spain in 2010.

Transfers
For consistency, fees in the record transfer tables below are all sourced from BBC Sport's contemporary reports of each transfer.

Record transfer fees paid

Record transfer fees received

Managerial records 

 First managers: William Edward Barclay and John McKenna, from 15 February 1892 to 16 August 1896.
 Longest-serving manager by time: Tom Watson, from 17 August 1896 to 6 May 1915 (18 years, 262 days).
 Longest-serving manager by matches: Bill Shankly managed the club for 783 matches over a period of 14 years and seven months, from December 1959 to July 1974.
 Most matches managed: 783, Bill Shankly.
 Most matches won as manager: 407, Bill Shankly.
 Most matches lost as a manager: 272, Tom Watson.
 Most goals scored under a manager: 1,307, Bill Shankly.
 Most goals conceded under a manager: 1,056, Tom Watson.

Club records

Matches

Firsts
 First match: Liverpool 7–1 Rotherham Town, a friendly match, 1 September 1892.
 First Lancashire League match: Liverpool 8–0 Higher Walton, 3 September 1892.
 First Football League match: Liverpool 2–0 Middlesbrough Ironopolis, Second Division, 2 September 1893.
 First FA Cup match: Liverpool 4–0 Nantwich Town, first qualifying round, 15 October 1892.
 First League Cup match: Liverpool 1–1 Luton Town, second round, 19 October 1960.
 First European match: Liverpool 5–0 KR Reykjavik, European Cup, first round, 17 August 1964.

Wins
 Record win: 11–0 against Strømsgodset in the European Cup Winners' Cup, 17 September 1974.
 Record league wins: 10–1 against Rotherham Town in Second Division, 18 February 1896, 9–0 against Crystal Palace in First Division, 12 September 1989 and 9–0 against Bournemouth in Premier League, 27 August 2022.

 Record home league win: 9–0 against Crystal Palace in First Division, 12 September 1989 and 9–0 against Bournemouth in Premier League, 27 August 2022.
 Record away league win: 0–7 against Crystal Palace in Premier League, 19 December 2020.
 Record FA Cup win: 9–0 against Newtown in second qualifying round, 29 October 1892.
 Record League Cup win: 10–0 against Fulham in second round, first-leg, 23 September 1986.
 Most league wins in a season: 
 38 games: 32 wins (during the 2019–20 season).
 42 games: 30 wins (during the 1978–79 season).
 Fewest league wins in a season: 2 wins from 30 games (during the 1891–92 season).
 Most home wins in a season (all competitions): 22 (during the 2000–01, 2018–19 and 2019–20 seasons.
 Most wins away from home in a season: 14 (during the 2019–20 season).

Defeats
 Record defeat: 1–9 against Birmingham City in Second Division, 11 December 1954.
 Record defeat at Anfield: 0–6 against Sunderland in First Division, 19 April 1930.
 Record-scoring defeat: 2–9 against Newcastle United in First Division, 1 January 1934.
 Record Premier League defeat: 1–6 against Stoke City, 24 May 2015, 0–5 against Manchester City, 9 September 2017, 2–7 against Aston Villa, 4 October 2020.
 Record FA Cup defeat: 0–5 against Bolton Wanderers in fourth round, first leg, 26 January 1946.
 Record League Cup defeat: 0–5 against Aston Villa in quarter-finals, 17 December 2019.
 Most league defeats in a season: 23 defeats from 42 games (during the 1953–54 season).
 Fewest defeats in a season: Unbeaten during the 28-game 1893–94 season.

Record consecutive results
 Record consecutive wins: 11 (from 18 February 1989 to 11 April 1989 and 15 March 2006 to 7 May 2006.).
 Record consecutive league wins: 18 (from 27 October 2019 to 24 February 2020).
 Record consecutive league wins from start of season: 8 (during the 1990–91 and 2019–20 seasons).
 Record consecutive defeats: 9 (from 29 April 1899 to 14 October 1899).
 Record consecutive league matches without a defeat: 44 (from 12 January 2019 to 24 February 2020).
 Record consecutive home league wins: 24 (from 9 February 2019 to 5 July 2020).
 Record consecutive draws: 6 (from 19 February 1975 to 19 March 1975).
 Record consecutive home matches without defeat: 85 (from 7 February 1978 to 31 January 1981).
 Record consecutive home league matches without defeat: 68 (from 7 May 2017 to 17 January 2021).
 Record consecutive matches in which Liverpool have scored a goal: 34 (from 19 April 2021 to 22 December 2021).
 Record consecutive matches without conceding a goal: 11 (from 29 October 2005 to 18 December 2005).
Record consecutive home league defeats: 6 (from 21 January 2021 to 7 March 2021).

Goals
 Most league goals scored in a season: 106 in 30 games (during the 1895–96 season, Second Division).
 Most top flight goals scored in a season: 101 in 38 games (during the 2013–14 season, Premier League).
 Fewest league goals scored in a season: 42 in 34 and 42 games (during the 1901–02 and 1970–71 seasons, First Division).
 Most league goals conceded in a season: 97 in 42 games (during the 1953–54 season, First Division).
 Fewest league goals conceded in a season: 16 in 42 games (during the 1978–79 season, First Division).
 Most consecutive league matches with a Liverpool goal: 36 (from 10 March 2019 to 24 February 2020).
 Most consecutive league matches with a Liverpool goal since the start of a season: 27 (during the 2019–20 season).

Points
 Most points in a season:
 Two points for a win: 68 (in 42 games in 1978–79, First Division).
 Three points for a win: 99 points in 38 games in 2019–20, Premier League).

 Fewest points in a season:
 Two points for a win: 22 (in 30 games in 1894–95, First Division).
 Three points for a win: 52 (in 38 games in 2011–12, Premier League).

Attendances
 Record highest home attendance: 61,905 (against Wolverhampton Wanderers in the 1951–52 FA Cup).
 Highest league home attendance: 58,757 (against Chelsea, First Division in the 1949–50 season).
 Highest League Cup home attendance: 52,694 (against Tottenham Hotspur, in the 2016–17 season).
 Highest European home attendance: 55,104 (against Barcelona, in the 1975–76 season).
 Record lowest home attendance: 1,000 (against Loughborough, Second Division in the 1895–96 season).
 Lowest FA Cup home attendance: 4,000 (against Newtown, in the 1892–93 season).
 Lowest League Cup home attendance: 9,902 (against Brentford in the 1983–84 season).
 Lowest European home attendance: 12,021 (against Dundalk in the 1982–83 season).

Liverpool recorded a 95,446 attendance against Melbourne Victory in a pre-season friendly in July 2013 at the Melbourne Cricket Ground, Australia; the largest ever crowd for a football match in Victoria at the time, as well as the highest in Liverpool's history. In July 2018, Liverpool bested this attendance with a 101,254 strong crowd at Michigan Stadium in a game against Manchester United during the 2018 International Champions Cup.

European statistics

Footnotes

References
General

Specific

Bibliography
 
 
 
 

Liverpool
Statistics